Synechococcus (from the Greek synechos, in succession, and the Greek kokkos, granule) is a unicellular cyanobacterium that is very widespread in the marine environment. Its size varies from 0.8 to 1.5 µm. The photosynthetic coccoid cells are preferentially found in well–lit surface waters where it can be very abundant (generally 1,000 to 200,000 cells per ml). Many freshwater species of Synechococcus have also been described.

The genome of S. elongatus strain PCC7002 has a size of 3,008,047 bp, whereas the oceanic strain WH8102 has a genome of size 2.4 Mbp.

Introduction 
Synechococcus is one of the most important components of the prokaryotic autotrophic picoplankton in the temperate to tropical oceans. The genus was first described in 1979, and was originally defined to include "small unicellular cyanobacteria with ovoid to cylindrical cells that reproduce by binary traverse fission in a single plane and lack sheaths". This definition of the genus Synechococcus contained organisms of considerable genetic diversity and was later subdivided into subgroups based on the presence of the accessory pigment phycoerythrin. The marine forms of Synechococcus are coccoid cells between 0.6 and 1.6 µm in size. They are Gram-negative cells with highly structured cell walls that may contain projections on their surface. Electron microscopy frequently reveals the presence of phosphate inclusions, glycogen granules, and more importantly, highly structured carboxysomes.

Cells are known to be motile by a gliding method and a novel uncharacterized, nonphototactic swimming method that does not involve flagellar motion. While some cyanobacteria are capable of photoheterotrophic or even chemoheterotrophic growth, all marine Synechococcus strains appear to be obligate photoautotrophs that are capable of supporting their nitrogen requirements using nitrate, ammonia, or in some cases urea as a sole nitrogen source. Marine Synechococcus species are traditionally not thought to fix nitrogen.

In the last decade, several strains of Synechococcus elongatus have been produced in laboratory environments to include the fastest growing cyanobacteria to date, Synechococcus elongatus UTEX 2973. S. elongatus UTEX 2973 is a mutant hybrid from UTEX 625 and is most closely related to S. elongatus PCC 7942 with 99.8% similarity (Yu et al., 2015). It has the shortest doubling time at “1.9 hours in a BG11 medium at 41°C under continuous 500 μmoles photons·m−2·s−1 white light with 3% CO2” (Racharaks et al., 2019).

Pigments
The main photosynthetic pigment in Synechococcus is chlorophyll a, while its major accessory pigments are phycobiliprotein. The four commonly recognized phycobilins are phycocyanin, allophycocyanin, allophycocyanin B and phycoerythrin. In addition Synechococcus also contains zeaxanthin but no diagnostic pigment for this organism is known. Zeaxanthin is also found in Prochlorococcus, red algae and as a minor pigment in some chlorophytes and eustigmatophytes. Similarly, phycoerythrin is also found in rhodophytes and some cryptomonads.

Phylogeny
Phylogenetic description of Synechococcus is difficult. Isolates are morphologically very similar, yet exhibit a G+C content ranging from 39 to 71%, illustrating the large genetic diversity of this provisional taxon. Initially, attempts were made to divide the group into three subclusters, each with a specific range of genomic G+C content. The observation that open-ocean isolates alone nearly span the complete G+C spectrum, however, indicates that Synechococcus is composed of at least several species. Bergey's Manual (Herdman et al. 2001) now divides Synechococcus into five clusters (equivalent to genera) based on morphology, physiology, and genetic traits.

Cluster 1 includes relatively large (1–1.5 µm) nonmotile obligate photoautotrophs that exhibit low salt tolerance. Reference strains for this cluster are PCC6301 (formerly Anacycstis nidulans) and PCC6312, which were isolated from fresh water in Texas and California, respectively. Cluster 2 also is characterized by low salt tolerance. Cells are obligate photoautrotrophs, lack phycoerythrin, and are thermophilic. The reference strain PCC6715 was isolated from a hot spring in Yellowstone National Park. Cluster 3 includes phycoerythrin-lacking marine Synechococcus species that are euryhaline, i.e. capable of growth in both marine and freshwater environments. Several strains, including the reference strain PCC7003, are facultative heterotrophs and require vitamin B12 for growth. Cluster 4 contains a single isolate, PCC7335. This strain is obligate marine. This strain contains phycoerthrin and was first isolated from the intertidal zone in Puerto Peñasco, Mexico. The last cluster contains what had previously been referred to as ‘marine A and B clusters’ of Synechococcus. These cells are truly marine and have been isolated from both the coastal and the open ocean. All strains are obligate photoautrophs and are around 0.6–1.7 µm in diameter. This cluster is, however, further divided into a population that either contains (cluster 5.1) or does not contain (cluster 5.2) phycoerythrin. The reference strains are WH8103 for the phycoerythrin-containing strains and WH5701 for those strains that lack this pigment.

More recently, Badger et al. (2002) proposed the division of the cyanobacteria into a α- and a β-subcluster based on the type of rbcL (large subunit of ribulose 1,5-bisphosphate carboxylase/oxygenase) found in these organisms. α-cyanobacteria were defined to contain a form IA, while β-cyanobacteria were defined to contain a form IB of this gene. In support for this division Badger et al. analyze the phylogeny of carboxysomal proteins, which appear to support this division. Also, two particular bicarbonate transport systems appear to only be found in α-cyanobacteria, which lack carboxysomal carbonic anhydrases.

The complete phylogenetic tree of 16S rRNA sequences of Synechococcus revealed at least 12 groups, which morphologically correspond to Synechococcus, but they have not derived from the common ancestor. Moreover, it has been estimated based on molecular dating that the first Synechococcus lineage has appeared 3 billion years ago in thermal springs with subsequent radiation to marine and freshwater environments.

Ecology and distribution

Synechococcus has been observed to occur at concentrations ranging between a few cells to 106 cells per ml in virtually all regions of oceanic euphotic zone except in samples from the McMurdo Sound and Ross Ice Shelf in Antarctica. Cells are generally much more abundant in nutrient-rich environments than in the oligotrophic ocean and prefer the upper, well-lit portion of the euphotic zone. Synechococcus has also been observed to occur at high abundances in environments with low salinities and/or low temperatures. It is usually far outnumbered by Prochlorococcus in all environments where they co-occur. Exceptions to this rule are areas of permanently enriched nutrients such as upwelling areas and coastal watersheds. In the nutrient-depleted areas of the oceans, such as the central gyres, Synechococcus is apparently always present, although only at low concentrations, ranging from a few to 4×10³ cells per ml. Vertically Synechococcus is usually relatively equitably distributed throughout the mixed layer and exhibits an affinity for the higher-light areas. Below the mixed layer, cell concentrations rapidly decline. Vertical profiles are strongly influenced by hydrologic conditions and can be very variable both seasonally and spatially. Overall, Synechococcus abundance often parallels that of Prochlorococcus in the water column. In the Pacific high-nutrient, low-chlorophyll zone and in temperate open seas where stratification was recently established both profiles parallel each other and exhibit abundance maxima just about the subsurface chlorophyll maximum.

The factors controlling the abundance of Synechococcus still remain poorly understood, especially considering that even in the most nutrient-depleted regions of the central gyres, where cell abundances are often very low, population growth rates are often high and not drastically limited. Factors such as grazing, viral mortality, genetic variability, light adaptation, and temperature, as well as nutrients are certainly involved, but remain to be investigated on a rigorous and global scale. Despite the uncertainties,  a relationship probably exists between ambient nitrogen concentrations and Synechococcus abundance, with an inverse relationship to Prochlorococcus in the upper euphotic zone, where light is not limiting. One environment where Synechococcus thrives particularly well is coastal plumes of major rivers. Such plumes are coastally enriched with nutrients such as nitrate and phosphate, which drives large phytoplankton blooms. High productivity in coastal river plumes is often associated with large populations of Synechococcus and elevated form IA (cyanobacterial) rbcL mRNA.

Prochlorococcus is thought to be at least 100 times more abundant than Synechococcus in warm oligotrophic waters. Assuming average cellular carbon concentrations, it has thus been estimated that Prochlorococcus accounts for at least 22 times more carbon in these waters, thus may be of much greater significance to the global carbon cycle than Synechococcus.

Evolutionary history 

Free floating viruses have been found carrying photosynthetic genes, and Synechococcus samples have been found to have viral proteins associated with photosynthesis. It is estimated 10% of all photosynthesis on earth is carried out with viral genes. Not all viruses immediately kill their hosts, 'temperate' viruses co-exist with their host until stresses or nearing end of natural life span make them switch their host to virus production; if a mutation occurs that stops this final step, the host can carry the virus genes with no ill effects. And if a healthy host reproduces while infectious, its offspring can be infectious as well. It is likely such a process gave Synechococcus photosynthesis.

Species

Synechococcus ambiguus Skuja
Synechococcus arcuatus var. calcicolus Fjerdingstad
Synechococcus bigranulatus Skuja
Synechococcus brunneolus Rabenhorst
Synechococcus caldarius Okada
Synechococcus capitatus A. E. Bailey-Watts & J. Komárek
Synechococcus carcerarius Norris
Synechococcus elongatus (Nägeli) Nägeli
Synechococcus endogloeicus F. Hindák
Synechococcus epigloeicus F. Hindák
Synechococcus ferrunginosus Wawrik
Synechococcus intermedius Gardner
Synechococcus koidzumii Yoneda
Synechococcus lividus Copeland
Synechococcus marinus Jao
Synechococcus minutissimus Negoro
Synechococcus mundulus Skuja
Synechococcus nidulans (Pringsheim) Komárek
Synechococcus rayssae Dor
Synechococcus rhodobaktron Komárek & Anagnostidis
Synechococcus roseo-persicinus Grunow
Synechococcus roseo-purpureus G. S. West
Synechococcus salinarum Komárek
Synechococcus salinus Frémy
Synechococcus sciophilus Skuja
Synechococcus sigmoideus (Moore & Carter) Komárek
Synechococcus spongiarum Usher et al.
Synechococcus subsalsus Skuja
Synechococcus sulphuricus Dor
Synechococcus vantieghemii (Pringsheim) Bourrelly
Synechococcus violaceus Grunow
Synechococcus viridissimus Copeland
Synechococcus vulcanus Copeland

See also
 Photosynthetic picoplankton
 Prochlorococcus
 Gloeomargarita lithophora
 Synechocystis, another cyanobacterial model organism

References

Further reading

External links 

Cyanobacteria genera
Synechococcales
Marine microorganisms